Hubbard Independent School District may refer to:

 Hubbard Independent School District (Bowie County, Texas)
 Hubbard Independent School District (Hill County, Texas)